Angry Video Game Nerd: The Movie (abbreviated as AVGN: The Movie) is a 2014 American independent science fiction adventure comedy film written and directed by James Rolfe and Kevin Finn (In their feature directional debut). It is based on the web series of the same name, also created by Rolfe, with himself as the lead character.

The story centers around the then urban legend of the mass burial of millions of copies of the 1982 Atari 2600 video game E.T. the Extra-Terrestrial, proclaimed as the "worst video game of all time". After a longstanding refusal to address the game in his web series, the Nerd succumbs to pressure by fans to review the video game, embarking on a quest to prove that there is nothing buried there. However, the crew is pursued by federal authorities, led by the villainous General Dark Onward, who believes he is investigating Area 51 and the crash of an unidentified flying object.

The film premiered on July 21, 2014, at Grauman's Egyptian Theatre in Hollywood, followed by a limited release in theaters through July and August in the United States. The film released online via video-on-demand on September 2, 2014. The Blu-ray version of the film was released on December 14, 2014, through Amazon.com, with the DVD version released on May 13, 2015. The film's budget of over  came entirely from Internet crowdfunding. It received mixed reviews from critics with many praising the soundtrack, visual effects, performances and faithfulness to the web series, but criticizing the story, pacing and length.

Plot
In 1983, 2 million copies of the "worst video game of all time", ET for the Atari 2600, are dumped into a landfill outside Alamogordo, New Mexico. In the present day, game executive Mandi (Sarah Glendening) of Cockburn Industries, Inc. proposes to her bosses creating an intentionally bad sequel, EeeTee 2. Thanks to the popularity and success of the Angry Video Game Nerd, sales of poorly made video games have increased dramatically, and a review of EeeTee 2 by the Nerd would drive his fans to buy the game.

The Nerd (James Rolfe) and his sidekick Cooper Folly (Jeremy Suarez) are working on a video game review. The Nerd has become disheartened over the years, as his fans continue to buy and play the games he reviews and warns people to stay away from. On top of this, the Nerd must promote and sell bad video games as part of his job at GameCops. When he discovers marketing for EeeTee 2, his fans encourage him to review ET, something he has stood against for years because the game scarred him as a child. After some personal thought, the Nerd decides to go to Alamogordo to debunk the conspiracy theory surrounding the buried cartridges, promising to review the game if the theory proves to be true. He is accompanied by Cooper and Mandi, and the trip is completely funded by Cockburn Industries.

While filming their expedition, Cooper reveals that he believes in a super-being known as Death Mwauthzyx, who has the power to destroy all existence. Sergeant McButter (Helena Barrett) and the legless General Dark Onward (Stephen Mendel), thinking the trio is looking for extraterrestrials, attempt to capture them. Onward accidentally blows his right arm off with a grenade, giving the trio enough time to escape.

The Nerd, Cooper and Mandi search for the creator of ET, Howard Scott Warshaw, for answers. They instead stumble across the home of Dr. Zandor (Time Winters), who tells them that ETs level design is an exact map of Area 51. Dr. Zandor gave the code to Warshaw to help him meet the five-week deadline Atari set for ETs completion, and to exact revenge on the government for kidnapping and holding hostage an alien he was attempting to free. The government ordered the burial of the cartridges, while Zandor escaped with the metallic material Area 51 was researching at the time in an attempt to reassemble the alien's spaceship, replacing it with tin foil. Mandi is captured by McButter while wandering outside of the house. The Nerd and Cooper, believing she is a double agent, do not go after her.

Going back to the Alamogordo site, the Nerd and Cooper discover a large crowd of fans and the head of Cockburn Industries promoting the release of ET 2 with the promise of digging out a copy of the original ET from the site. The Nerd tells his fans there are no cartridges buried there, but Warshaw himself appears and tells fans the opposite. Annoyed, the Nerd breaks into Area 51 disguised as an alien. He is captured, and General Onward attempts to force him to play ET. Onward launches a missile at Mount Fuji, the basis for the Atari logo, and while leaving the room, gets his left arm cut off in the door. During the launch countdown, an alien resembling the one in ET grabs the Nerd and pulls him to safety.

The destruction of Mount Fuji releases Death Mwauthzyx, who was trapped inside the mountain. Meanwhile, Mandi keeps McButter away from the Nerd and Cooper's location, eventually leading them to a confrontation on the Eiffel Tower in Las Vegas.

The Nerd and alien escape in a fighter jet similar to one in the NES Top Gun video game, while the alien reveals Death Mwauthzyx can destroy all existence by turning the satellite dish on his head. Cooper is captured by Death Mwauthzyx and brought to Las Vegas, where Mandi knocks McButter off the Eiffel Tower to her death. Mandi is also captured by Death Mwauthzyx. The Nerd and Alien crash-land at the Alamogordo site, where a captured Dr. Zandor shouts to them that he hid the alien's spaceship metal inside the millions of ET game cartridges. Alien summons every single copy of the game to form the spaceship. The Nerd and Alien leave for Las Vegas to stop Death Mwauthzyx. The limbless General Onward is killed when attempting to stop them.

The Nerd fires a laser at Death Mwauthzyx's satellite dish, with the laser bouncing around inside of it before being shot into space where it seemingly comes across many mysteries of the universe, and somehow returns to strike the satellite dish again. Afterwards, Death Mwauthzyx puts on a pair of Groucho Marx glasses and nose, laughs and flies away from the Earth. They return to the Alamogordo site and reunite with Dr. Zandor and the Nerd's fans. Cooper and Mandi share a kiss, and then the Nerd reviews ET 2. Afterwards, the Nerd finally reviews the original Atari 2600 ET during the end credits for his fans, then delivers a heartfelt message about classic games and not-so-classic games, before the Alien leaves for good.

Cast

Development
James Rolfe had spent much of his life aspiring to be a professional feature filmmaker, and saw popularity of the AVGN web series the opportunity to fulfill this ambition. Development of the film began in late 2006, following the popularity of The Angry Video Game Nerd web series, with the completion of the screenplay by 2008. E.T. game designer Howard Scott Warshaw hinted in an article in GamesTM magazine that he would be playing himself in the movie. Production of the film was delayed for several years due to the busy production schedule of Rolfe's AVGN web series, wherein Rolfe was continuously filming two episodes per month.

Filming in California started April 1, 2012, and wrapped on May 11, 2012. Additional scenes were being filmed in the actors' spare time, mainly in Philadelphia. Production officially ended in December 2013.

Rolfe consistently utilized online articles and videos to document the movie's development and to solicit talent for casting and crew. Open casting calls were held, including one hosted by Channel Awesome held in Chicago, with live auditions held by one of the film's actors, Doug Walker, also the actor of the Nostalgia Critic. Rolfe asked for his fanbase to provide fictional webcam footage of themselves reacting to the Nerd's webseries to be used in a sequence at the beginning of the film which introduces the Angry Video Game Nerd character.

Using the Panasonic AG-AF100 camera, James Rolfe chose to use mostly practical special effects for the film's 942 visual effects shots, creating the majority by filming miniatures in front of a green screen which were then later digitally composited into the film. Though this process was more time-consuming than using CGI, Rolfe believed that the use of scale models would help add to the film's intended B movie feel.

The game's review featured in the end credits was later released as a stand-alone episode of The Angry Video Game Nerd web series, featuring the game under its proper title rather than the "Eee Tee" spoof used in the film, which was used to avoid legal dispute from copyright holders of the film the video game is based on.

Soundtrack
The film's score was composed by Bear McCreary, who had previously worked with Rolfe on the web series Christmas special "How The Nerd Stole Christmas". McCreary utilized rock-and-roll music, heavy metal music, a symphonic orchestra, and synthesized elements from NES, SNES, and SEGA Genesis hardware to compose the score. The album features two remixes by McCreary, as well as two songs written by his brother Brendan McCreary and performed by his band Young Beautiful in a Hurry.
The album was released on the iTunes Store on September 2, 2014.

In an interview with BeardedGentlemenMusic, McCreary states: "Over the years I’ve made all these custom samples emulating the sounds of NES hardware. I always wanted to be able to recreate those sounds I love but I didn’t really have a place to put them you know? So when working on that movie with James, not only did I have the opportunity to do a cinematic score, but I also had a place to use all those sounds from my youth and write an actual score but use the sounds of the 8-bit Nintendo era, the Sega Genesis, and the Super Nintendo! It was quite literally a childhood dream coming true! I’m grateful to James for that opportunity."

All music was composed by McCreary, except where otherwise noted.

Reception
Angry Video Game Nerd: The Movie received mixed reviews from critics. The Hollywood Reporter called it an "overly long and almost obsessively self-indulgent" and "aspiring cult film" with production value which "hovers above home-video quality by a few admirable notches", noting that the "filmmakers manage to capably anchor these disparate storylines to their central plot concerning crusading gamers."

The Michigan Daily student newspaper of the University of Michigan gave this film a mostly negative review, describing it as unfunny, poorly edited, badly paced, and too long. This review argued that the soundtrack by Bear McCreary was good and the best aspect of the film. The reviewer noted that The Angry Video Game Nerd was "the pioneering internet 'gamer' show," which he had enjoyed greatly, so the film was a "disappointing failure."

Kevin T. Rodriguez of iCritic gave the film a positive review while acknowledging the lack of accessibility for non-fans of the character, writing "Yes, it's uneven at times. In fact, I would argue that there is probably some fifteen minutes of footage in here that could be cut from the film that would result in better pacing. I suspect that the people who see this movie won't have the problems most people who watch movies would have though. It lives in its own little bubble, mining comedy from the most unlikely of sources and fully embracing the silliness of the whole affair. Rolfe may not be the most versatile actor I've seen but it's clear that he has created a memorable character and has mastered facial expressions for great comedic effect."

Teen Ink wrote that the movie was "among the most comical things on offer, coalescing a physically contacting naivety with language that could peel paint."

Future
While Rolfe has not completely ruled out the possibility of a sequel, he has said that it is highly unlikely due to his lack of time, as Angry Video Game Nerd: The Movie took several years to complete, and he would rather focus on other film projects. Rolfe did state that they have had ideas, though, including a sequel centered on the missing prizes of the Atari Swordquest contest.

See also
 List of films featuring extraterrestrials

References

External links

 

2014 films
2014 independent films
American action comedy films
American adventure comedy films
American science fiction comedy films
American science fantasy films
American independent films
Cinemassacre
Crowdfunded films
Films about video games
Films based on web series
Films shot in California
Films shot in Philadelphia
Films set in the Las Vegas Valley
Indiegogo projects
Films scored by Bear McCreary
2010s English-language films
2010s American films